James Lauder may refer to:

James Eckford Lauder (1811–1869), Scottish artist, famous for both portraits and historical pictures
James Lafayette, pseudonym of James Stack Lauder (1853–1923), Irish portrait photographer